Khayaban: An Interdisciplinary Journal of the Language Sciences (alt. Khiyābān) is a biannual peer-reviewed academic journal of linguistics and literature published in Urdu by the Institute of Urdu and Persian Language and Literature at the University of Peshawar.

References

External links 
 

Publications established in 1958
Linguistics journals
Urdu-language journals
University of Peshawar
Biannual journals